Clark Township is one of the sixteen townships of Brown County, Ohio, United States. The 2010 census found 3,121 people in the township, 2,575 of whom lived in the unincorporated portions of the township.

Geography
Located in the western part of the county, it borders the following townships:
Pike Township - north
Scott Township - east
Pleasant Township - southeast
Lewis Township - south
Tate Township, Clermont County - west
Williamsburg Township, Clermont County - northwest corner

The village of Hamersville is located in central Clark Township.

Name and history
Clark Township was established in 1808. Statewide, other Clark Townships are located in Clinton, Coshocton, and Holmes counties.

Government
The township is governed by a three-member board of trustees, who are elected in November of odd-numbered years to a four-year term beginning on the following January 1. Two are elected in the year after the presidential election and one is elected in the year before it. There is also an elected township fiscal officer, who serves a four-year term beginning on April 1 of the year after the election, which is held in November of the year before the presidential election. Vacancies in the fiscal officership or on the board of trustees are filled by the remaining trustees.

References

External links
County website

Townships in Brown County, Ohio
1808 establishments in Ohio
Townships in Ohio